The Anchorage, also known as the Farlie House, is a Colonial Revival mansion located in Montclair, Essex County, New Jersey, United States. Designed by the architect Francis A. Nelson, the house was built in 1930 and was added to the National Register of Historic Places on July 1, 1988.

See also
National Register of Historic Places listings in Essex County, New Jersey

References

Houses on the National Register of Historic Places in New Jersey
Colonial Revival architecture in New Jersey
Houses completed in 1930
Houses in Essex County, New Jersey
Montclair, New Jersey
National Register of Historic Places in Essex County, New Jersey
New Jersey Register of Historic Places